Kulibukhna (Dargwa: ХъулибухӀна) is a rural locality (a selo) in Tsudakharsky Selsoviet, Levashinsky District, Republic of Dagestan, Russia. The population was 409 as of 2010. There are 4 streets.

Geography 
Kulibukhna is located 32 km southwest of Levashi (the district's administrative centre) by road, on the Sana River. Kuli and Kara are the nearest rural localities.

Nationalities 
Dargins live there.

References 

Rural localities in Levashinsky District